"Sad Eyes" is a song written by Neil Sedaka and Phil Cody and performed by Andy Williams.  The song reached #11 on the adult contemporary chart in 1975.

References

1975 singles
Songs written by Neil Sedaka
Andy Williams songs
Columbia Records singles
Songs with lyrics by Phil Cody
1975 songs